Buldak or fire chicken is a heavily spiced, barbecued chicken dish. The literal meaning of the name is "fire chicken", where bul means "fire" and dak translates to "chicken."

History 
Buldak became popular in South Korea during 2004, primarily for its extreme pungency, as the country's long-term recession and economic downturn caused the local population to seek out spicy food to relieve stress. The rise in popularity of buldak set the trend for extremely hot dishes in South Korea, which led to the rise of buldak franchise restaurants. However, the name buldak was registered at a patent office in April 2001 by Buwon Food, who claimed copyright to the name. This led to strong opposition from Hongcho Buldak and other leading buldak restaurants, who claimed that the term had been used as a common noun. On 30 April 2008, the Patent Court of Korea agreed that term was generalized and buldak became free for public use. Although the popularity of buldak has declined in recent years in South Korea, the dish has led to the development of other successful dishes inspired by it, such as buldak-flavored instant noodles by Samyang Food.

Preparation and serving 
Buldak can be grilled or deep-fried using bite-sized chicken pieces, and is served with a spicy sauce usually including gochugaru (chili powder), gochujang (chili paste), soy sauce, jocheong (starch syrup), garlic, and ginger. Chili powder made from Cheongyang chili pepper is preferred as it is spicier than regular chili powder used in Korean recipes. Sliced garae-tteok (rice cakes) and melted cheese are common additions to the dish. Mild side dishes such as gyeran-jjim (steamed eggs) or boiled nurungji (scorched rice) are often served with buldak to help counteract the spiciness. The dish is usually accompanied with an alcoholic beverage such as beer.

See also 

 Jjimdak
 Padak
 Tongdak
 Korean fried chicken
 Hot Chicken Flavor Ramen
 List of chicken dishes

References 

South Korean chicken dishes